Metrosideros punctata is a species of plant in the family Myrtaceae. It is endemic to New Caledonia.  It is threatened by habitat loss.

References

punctata
Endemic flora of New Caledonia
Vulnerable plants
Taxonomy articles created by Polbot
Taxa named by John Dawson (botanist)